Bruno Joseph Chérier (10 August 1817 – 24 October 1880) was a French decorative painter. Born in Valenciennes, he studied under Jean-Baptiste Carpeaux, for whom he also modelled. He died in the 14th arrondissement of Paris.

Works

Lille
 Église Saint-Sauveur - Stations of the Cross
 Église Saint-Martin d'Esquermes - paintings for the altar of the Virgin Mary
 Église Notre-Dame-de-Fives - four canvases in the choir

Tourcoing
 Église Saint-Christophe- altarpieces
 Église Saint-Jacques  - two stained glass windows

Other
 Notre-Dame des Anges - Tourcoing - Stations of the Cross, stained class, ornamental paintings
 Church (now demolished) - Monchy-le-Preux - stained glass and sculptures
 Notre-Dame de Grâce - Loos - painting in the nave
 Church - Haussy - Stations of the Cross

Sources

People from Valenciennes
19th-century French painters
1817 births
1880 deaths